The national flag of Angola came into use  when Angola gained independence on November 11, 1975. It is split horizontally into an upper red half and a lower black half with an emblem resting at the center. It features a yellow half gear wheel crossed by a machete and crowned with a star.

History
The flag was designed by Henrique Onambwé. The process of cutting and sewing the first version of the flag was done by Joaquina, Ruth Lara and Cici Cabral on November 11, 1975.

The Angolan flag is based on the flag of the Popular Movement for the Liberation of Angola (MPLA), which fought Portuguese colonial rule and emerged as the ruling party of Angola following the Angolan Civil War. The MPLA flag is similar to the flag of Angola but features a star in place of the central emblem.

Description
The National Flag of the Republic of Angola has two horizontal bands of red and black with the Machete and Gear Emblem in gold in the center consisted of a five pointed-star within a half gear wheel crossed by a machete (resembling the hammer and sickle used on the Soviet flag). As outlined in the Constitution of Angola, the red half of the flag signifies bloodshed – during Angola's colonial period, independence struggle, and in defense of the country. The black half symbolizes Africa. In the central emblem, the gear represents industrial workers and production, the machete represents peasantry, agricultural production and the armed struggle, and the star, shaped like the red star, symbolizes international solidarity and progress. The yellow color of the emblem symbolizes the country's wealth. The Constitution of 1975 described the red stripe as symbolizing bloodshed during the colonial period, national liberation and a revolution – and reference to revolution was replaced with "defense of the country" in the constitution of 1992. In other changes of wording between the 1975 and 1992 versions, the star was changed from a symbol of "internationalism" to "international solidarity," and references to "working class" and "peasant class" were replaced with "workers" and "peasants".

Colors

2003 proposal 
In 2003, a new, more "optimistic" flag was proposed by the Parliament's Constitutional Commission of the National Assembly (Angolan Parliament), but it was not adopted. The sun design in the middle is meant to be reminiscent of cave paintings found in Tchitundo-Hulu cave.  The flag maintained the same flag proportions of 2:3.

Gallery

See also
 List of Angolan flags

References

External links

https://web.archive.org/web/20040622113124/http://www.angola.org/referenc/proposed_flag.html

Angola
National symbols of Angola
Angola
Angola
1975 establishments in Angola